Ithaca Intersystems, Inc., was a microcomputer manufacturer in the 1970s and 1980s, located in Ithaca, New York.  The early years drew on engineering talent from Cornell University when the founders, including Steven Edelman, worked in a small rented space in the Collegtown neighborhood adjacent to the university campus in 1976.  They initially produced the Ithaca Intersystems DPS-1 S-100 bus, Z80-based computer.  As a large commercial success, the company moved to larger spaces outside of town, and designed and produced a larger system, the Zilog Z8002-based DPS-8000.  This used the Coherent Unix-like operating system from Mark Williams Company. The company languished in the 1980s, not being part of the domination of the IBM PC and PC clones. The company closed in 1986 and was shortly thereafter rechristened as an audio company, Ithaca Audio.

They had an important role in the finalisation of the S-100 IEEE-696 Standard for S-100 [ref to be added] and worked closely with Digicomp Research in Terrace Hill, who also drew from Cornell Engineering. The Pascal-Z compiler was supplied with a DPS-1 front panel and an Ithaca S-100 box.

References

External links
 Marcus Bennett's InterSystems Datastore 
 old-computer.com page on the DPS-1 
 Johnson Ithaca Audio page
 YouTube video of a working Ithaca InterSystems DPS-1

American companies established in 1976
American companies disestablished in 1986
Computer companies established in 1976
Computer companies disestablished in 1986
Defunct computer companies of the United States
Ithaca, New York
Defunct companies based in New York (state)
Defunct manufacturing companies based in New York (state)